HNLMS Kortenaer was an   of the Royal Netherlands Navy, named after 17th century Dutch Admiral Egbert Bartholomeusz Kortenaer.

Design
In the mid-1920s, the Netherlands placed orders for four new destroyers to be deployed to the East Indies. They were built in Dutch shipyards to a design by the British Yarrow Shipbuilders, which was based on the destroyer , which Yarrow had designed and built for the British Royal Navy.

The ship's main gun armament was four  guns built by the Swedish company Bofors, mounted two forward and two aft, with two  anti-aircraft guns mounted amidships. Four 12.7 mm machine guns provided close-in anti-aircraft defence. The ship's torpedo armament comprised six  torpedo tubes in two triple mounts, while 24 mines could also be carried. To aid search operations, the ship carried a Fokker C.VII-W floatplane on a platform over the aft torpedo tubes, which was lowered to the sea by a crane for flight operations.

Service history
The ship was laid down on 24 August 1925, at the Burgerhout's Scheepswerf en Machinefabriek, in Rotterdam, and launched on 30 June 1927. The ship was commissioned on 3 September 1928.

On 11 June 1929, a detachment of marines was sent on Kortenaer to Curaçao, after Venezuelan rebels, led by Rafael Simón Urbina, had raided Fort Amsterdam, in Willemstad, on 8 June.

World War II
In 1940, she and her sister  guarded five German cargo ships. The ships were relieved by the cruiser  on 26 April 1940.

She served mostly in the Netherlands East Indies, and when war broke out in 1941, she was at Surabaya.

She took part in Battle of Badung Strait on 18–20 February 1942, where she ran aground on one of the channel shores after temporarily losing rudder control. It was impossible for the Dutch ship to return to the formation, and they had to wait for the next morning tide to free the ship. Kortenaer was sent to Surabaya for repairs.

She was back in action in time for the Battle of the Java Sea on 27 February 1942, where she was torpedoed at 17:14 by the Japanese cruiser . The commanding officer, Alexander Sharp, of the nearby United States Navy destroyer, recorded that, "Kortenaer, about  bearing 80° relative, was struck on the starboard quarter by a torpedo, blew up, turned over, and sank at once leaving only a jackknifed bow and stern a few feet above the surface." The Royal Navy destroyer  rescued 113 men from the total of 153, including Lieutenant Commander A. Kroese, and took them to Surabaya.

Wreck
The wreck of Kortenaer was discovered by specialist wreck divers in August 2004. In 2016 it was discovered that the wrecks of De Ruyter and Java, and much of Kortenaer had disappeared from the seabed, although their imprints on the ocean floor remained. Over 100 ships and submarines of various countries sank during the war in the seas around Indonesia, Singapore and Malaysia; many are designated as war graves. There is known to be illegal scavenging of these wrecks, often using explosives; the Netherlands Defence Ministry suggested that De Ruyter, Java, and  Kortenaer may have been illegally salvaged. In February 2017 a report was issued confirming the salvaging of the three wrecks.

References

Bibliography
 Gardiner, Robert and Roger Chesneau. Conway's All The World's Fighting Ships 1922–1946. London: Conway Maritime Press 1980. . 
 Whitley, M.J. Destroyers of World War Two: An International Encyclopedia. London: Cassell & Co, 2000. .

Admiralen-class destroyers
Ships built in Rotterdam
1927 ships
World War II destroyers of the Netherlands
World War II shipwrecks in the Java Sea
Maritime incidents in February 1942